Always is the third album by British singer Hazell Dean.

Released in October 1988, it coincided with the singer's comeback and featured the hit singles "Who's Leaving Who" (UK #4), "Maybe (We Should Call it a Day)" (UK #15) and "Turn It into Love" (UK #21). Also included were remixes of earlier singles; "They Say It's Gonna Rain" (UK #58, 1985), "No Fool (For Love)" (UK #41, 1985; original version included on Heart First), and "Always Doesn't Mean Forever" (UK #92). The album itself reached #38 - her highest placing in the album charts. The album was also released in the US in 1988 with an alternative cover.

On 23 April 2012, a remastered deluxe double edition with bonus tracks, including previously released singles that had not been included on any album; "ESP (Extra Sensual Persuasion)" (UK #98, 1986) and "Stand Up" (UK #79, 1986) - and several remixes has been released on the Cherry Pop UK label.

Track listing 

Side One
 "They Say It's Gonna Rain" (The Zulu Mix) (7:08) Producer - Stock Aitken Waterman
 "Who's Leaving Who" (Bob's Tambourine Mix) (4:45) Producer - Stock Aitken Waterman
 "Turn It into Love" (3:37) Producer - Stock Aitken Waterman 
 "You're My Rainbow" (5:13) Producer - Ian Levine

Side Two
 "Always Doesn't Mean Forever" (7:05) Producer - Stock Aitken Waterman
 "Maybe (We Should Call It a Day)" (6:39) Producer - Stock Aitken Waterman
 "Walk in My Shoes" (4:19) Producer - Trevor Vallis and Ian Curnow
 "Nothing in My Life" (3:46) Producer - Pete Hammond
 "Danger" (4:58) Producer - Pete Hammond

The Cassette version of the album included the song "No Fool (For Love)" (6:09), the Compact disc version also featured the song, "Ain't Nothing Like the Real Thing" (6:23) (a duet with Daryl Pandy).

Deluxe Edition

Released in 2012, it features the album plus a selection of non-album singles and b-sides on CD 1. CD 2 consists of remixes from various singles off the album.

CD One

 "They Say It's Gonna Rain" (7" Version) (3:59) Producer - Stock Aitken Waterman
 "Who's Leaving Who" (7" Version) (3:45) Producer - Stock Aitken Waterman
 "Turn It into Love" (3:37) Producer - Stock Aitken Waterman 
 "You're My Rainbow" (5:13) Producer - Ian Levine
 "Always Doesn't Mean Forever" (7" Version) (3:37) Producer - Stock Aitken Waterman
 "Maybe (We Should Call It a Day)" (7" Version) (3:40) Producer - Stock Aitken Waterman
 "Walk in My Shoes" (4:19) Producer - Trevor Vallis and Ian Curnow
 "Nothing in My Life" (3:46) Producer - Pete Hammond
 "Danger" (4:58) Producer - Hazell Dean and Pete Ware
 "No Fool (For Love)" (The Murray 7" Version) (3:24) Producer - Stock Aitken Waterman, remix by Phil Harding
 "Ain't Nothing Like the Real Thing" (6:23) (duet with Daryl Pandy) Producer - Ian Levine and Ian Curnow
 "Stand Up" (7" Version) (3:46) Producer - Stock Aitken Waterman
 "Can't Get You Out Of My Mind" (3:56) Producer - Stock Aitken Waterman
 "Love Ends Love Parts" (3:25) Producer - Stock Aitken Waterman
 "Walk In My Shoes" (7" Version) (3:54) Producer - Trevor Vallis
 "E.S.P." (7" Version) (3:30) Producer - Ian Anthony Stephens
 "Who's Leaving Who" (The Boys Are Back In Town Mix) (6:58)
 "Stand Up" (Extended Version) (6:59)

CD Two

 "E.S.P." (Extended Version) (10:34)
 "Image In The Mirror" (3:49) Producer - Ian Anthony Stephens
 "They Say It's Gonna Rain" (Indian Summer Mix) (6:20)
 "Always Doesn't Mean Forever" (My-Ami Mix) (7:07)
 "Maybe (We Should Call It A Day)" (Extended Version) (6:42)
 "Walk In My Shoes" (Nightmare Mix) (8:24)
 "Who's Leaving Who" (Bob's Tambourine Mix) (4:45)
 "Maybe (We Should Call It a Day)" (Extra Beat Boys Mix) (6:41)
 "Turn It into Love" (House Mix) (7:19)
 "They Say It's Gonna Rain" (Zulu Mix) (7:08)
 "Turn It into Love" (Alternative 12" Mix) (5:57)

References 

1988 albums
Albums produced by Stock Aitken Waterman